Jody Sperling is an American dancer, choreographer, and dance scholar based in New York City. She is the Founder/Artistic Director of Time Lapse Dance, a dance company that gives a postmodern twist to vintage genres, from the fin de siècle spectacles of Loie Fuller, to circus and music hall entertainments.

Biography
A dancer-choreographer from New York, Jody Sperling is the founder and Artistic Director of Time Lapse Dance. She has created more than 40 works and has performed and taught in the US, Bahrain, Canada, France, India, Ireland, Italy, Netherlands, Nigeria, Russia, Scotland and north of the Arctic Circle. In 2014, Sperling participated in a polar science mission to the Arctic as the first-ever choreographer-in-residence aboard the US Coast Guard Cutter Healy. During the expedition, she danced on the polar ice cap and made the award-winning dance film Ice Floe. Time Lapse Dance's production Bringing the Arctic Home transports Sperling's experience in the icescape to the stage.

Over the years, Sperling has forged a unique style inspired by modern dance pioneer Loïe Fuller (1862-1928). Internationally regarded as the leading exponent of Fuller's genre, she has taken the idiom into innovative directions. Sperling is the choreographer, creative consultant and dance coach for the upcoming French feature film La Danseuse inspired by Fuller's life.

Sperling has received commissions from the Vermont Performance Lab & Marlboro College, The University of Wyoming through the NEA American Masterpieces Program and the Streb Lab for Action Mechanics. Her works Clair de Lune, Fountains and Night Winds have been in the repertory of Holland's Introdans ensemble.

As a dancer, Sperling has performed in the works of other choreographers including Sarah Michelson and  Yvonne Rainer. Sperling has served on the board of directors of the Society of Dance History Scholars (SDHS) and has presented at the Society's conferences. She holds an MA in Performance Studies (Tisch School of the Arts, New York University) and a BA in Dance and Italian (Wesleyan University). Her dance writings have appeared online and in print in Dance Magazine, The Village Voice, The SDHS Conference Proceedings, The International Encyclopedia of Dance and the award-winning book Birds of Paradise: Costume as Cinematic Spectacle (British Film Institute, 2014).

References

External links
TimeLapseDance.com
Interview with Jody

Living people
American choreographers
American female dancers
Dancers from New York (state)
New York University alumni
Wesleyan College alumni
Year of birth missing (living people)
Place of birth missing (living people)
21st-century American women